The Barossa Light & Gawler Football Association, more commonly referred to as the BL&GFA, is an Australian rules football competition based in the Barossa Valley, Gawler Region and Light Region of South Australia, Australia. Just 42 kilometres north of the state capital of Adelaide, the BL&GFA is an affiliated member of the South Australian National Football League. In 2022, Nuriootpa secured the premiership cup for a record equalling eighth time. The current president of the League is Mick Brien and the major sponsor of the league is the Grant Burge Winery.

Current clubs

History 
The Kapunda Football Club is one of the oldest football clubs in the world to enjoy an uninterrupted identity. It was first originated by copper miners in 1866, while nearby the Gawler Football Club soon formed in 1868. These two clubs sent delegates to a meeting of 13 clubs which formed the South Australia Football Association in 1877. Even though they didn't compete in the SAFA competition at first, they  played invitational fixtures against visiting senior clubs from Adelaide.

In 1880, Gawler separated into two distinct clubs, Athenian and Havelock, followed by the Albion Football Club in 1881. Seven years later, the clubs recombined to form another club bearing the name of Gawler Albion.  This club was admitted with full senior status to the South Australian Football Association for the 1887 Season. In 1890, after four seasons in the SAFA, the Gawler Football Club left what is now the South Australian National Football League (SANFL) and folded – but a 'junior' club competition created in 1889 in the Gawler area to feed this main 'senior' club remained, to become the Gawler Football Association. In 1894, Kapunda formed an informal association with Angaston, Kapunda North, Greenock and Truro, most likely a precursor to the Barossa and Light Football Association which Kapunda later helped establish.

Gawler football

The Gawler Junior Football Association was formed in 1889 by founding clubs Gawler Central, South Gawler and Willaston. Teams from Church Hill, Gawler South and Willaston had actually been playing each other in scratch matches around Gawler as early as 1885, 1886 and 1887 – long before the GJFA. Church Hill was most likely the genesis of Gawler Central. And at times Willaston and South would even combine to play the main Gawler side who participated in the city.

In 1890 the Gawler Junior Football Association changed its name to Gawler Football Association in which later early member clubs would include Roseworthy College, Salisbury and Hamley Bridge. Throughout the twentieth century a number of transient clubs from within the town - such as Shamrocks, Rivals, Imperials, North Gawler, Rovers and Gawler Colts, along with others outside of Gawler - including Greenock, Sandy Creek, Wasleys, Roseworthy, Rurals (a unification of Roseworthy and Wasleys), One Tree Hill, Kangaroo Flat and Angle Vale, would also spasmodically compete in the GFA first and second grades.

By 1957 the GFA reached its greatest extent, becoming the giant Gawler and Districts Football League, with clubs competing in three senior divisions - Elizabeth, Elizabeth North, Gawler Central, Hamley Bridge, Lyndoch, Roseworthy, Roseworthy College, Salisbury, Salisbury North, Smithfield, South Gawler, Two Wells, Virginia, Willaston and Williamstown. Although over the next few decades, several of the more rural clubs departed for the neighbouring Adelaide Plains Football League, and following the inception of the Central District Bulldogs into the SANFL, the formation of the (now defunct) Central District Football Association saw the metropolitan clubs also eventually leave the GDFL.

Barossa & Light football
The Barossa & Light Football Association was inaugurated in 1908 with founding clubs comprising Angaston, Freeling, Kapunda, Nuriootpa and Tanunda, followed by Eudunda in 1910. Clubs such as Hamley Bridge, Greenock, Truro and Eden Valley would also later field sides intermittently at various times over the years in the first and second competitions. During the 1950s Eudunda returned, and by the 1980s the BLFA at its greatest extent also had annexed Robertstown and Riverton-Saddleworth Marrabel United (RSMU).

Merger
In 1987 the Barossa And Light Football Association merged with the Gawler & District Football League, to form a new "super-league", the Barossa Light And Gawler Football Association - the formation clubs being Angaston, Eudunda, Freeling, Gawler Central, Kapunda, Nuriootpa, RSMU, South Gawler, Tanunda and Willaston. After participating in the Hills Football League as an interim since the demise of the GDFL, Barossa District (a merger of the original Lyndoch and Williamstown clubs of the GDFL in 1980) finally entered the BLGFA in 1991, while in 1992 Eudunda, and later RSMU in 1998, left to the North Eastern Football League.

The current BLGFA comprises nine clubs from the Gawler Town, Light Plains and Barossa Valley region considered to be the heartland of the Central District Bulldogs.

Premierships

Year by year 

 1987 - Tanunda
 1988 - Willaston 
 1989 - Tanunda
 1990 - South Gawler 
 1991 - Gawler Central   
 1992 -  South Gawler 
 1993 -  South Gawler 
 1994 -  Freeling 
 1995 -  Nuriootpa 
 1996 -  Nuriootpa
 1997 -  Nuriootpa 
 1998 -  Nuriootpa 
 1999 -  Willaston 
 2000 -  Nuriootpa 
 2001 -  Gawler Central
 2002 -  Tanunda 
 2003 - Angaston 
 2004 - Kapunda 
 2005 - Kapunda 
 2006 - Barossa District
 2007 - Barossa District
 2008 - Tanunda
 2009 - Tanunda
 2010 - Tanunda
 2011 - Tanunda 
 2012 - Barossa District
 2013 - Barossa District
 2014 - Gawler Central
 2015 - Nuriootpa
 2016 - Barossa District
 2017 - Barossa District
 2018 - Nuriootpa
 2019 - Tanunda
 2020 - Gawler Central 
 2021 - South Gawler
 2022 - Nuriootpa

Premierships by club

Notable players 
The Barossa, Light and Gawler Football Association has produced a number of AFL players since its inception. Some of these players include Shannon Hurn (West Coast Eagles)  of Angaston Football Club, Sam Butler (West Coast Eagles) of South Gawler Football Club,  Justin Westhoff (Port Adelaide Power) of the Tanunda Football Club, Jonathan Giles (West Coast Eagles) of Kapunda.

Umpires
The Barossa, Light and Gawler Umpires Association (official website), commonly abbreviated to the BL&GUA, formed in 1987 when the Barossa & Light and Gawler Football Associations amalgamated, and now provides umpires for all matches within the Barossa, Light and Gawler Football Association. The Barossa, Light and Gawler Umpires Panel is based at Goodger Reserve, Willaston. The Barossa, Light and Gawler Umpires were one of the last groups of umpires in South Australia to wear the traditional white shirts until changing in 2022. The current Senior Coach of the Panel is Mark Miels, the Junior Coach is Ryan Prentice and the current President is Jim Goode.

Media

Publishing and print
The BL&G Football Association is covered each week by various local newspapers - The Herald, which circulates in all of the towns represented in the league; The Bunyip, from Gawler; and The Leader, from Angaston. An annual Football Book is produced by The Leader and is available free from various outlets in the region. It features the season's draw, officials, rules, constitutions and a history of the league's premiers and medal winners from all grades. The Barracker is the official match-day magazine and is sold at the entrance of all games.

References

Books
 Encyclopedia of South Australian country football clubs / compiled by Peter Lines. 
 South Australian country football digest / by Peter Lines

External links
 

Australian rules football competitions in South Australia